Grady v. Corbin, 495 U.S. 508 (1990), was a United States Supreme Court decision holding that: "the Double Jeopardy Clause bars a subsequent prosecution if, to establish an essential element of an offense charged in that prosecution, the government will prove conduct that constitutes an offense for which the defendant has already been prosecuted."

Background
In the fall of 1987, Thomas Corbin was driving under the influence as he drove his automobile across the center line of a New York highway and collided with two oncoming vehicles. Brenda Dirago, the driver of the second vehicle, died in this accident while her husband was seriously injured. Later that same day, Corbin was charged with DUI and pleaded guilty.

Opinion of the Court
In an opinion by Justice Brennan, the Supreme Court ruled that to subsequently try him for homicide would constitute double jeopardy.

Aftermath
Grady was only valid law for three years. It was overturned by United States v. Dixon, which rejected the same conduct test in favor of the longstanding same element test. The same element test had been the law since Blockburger v. United States.

See also
 List of United States Supreme Court cases, volume 495
 List of United States Supreme Court cases
 Lists of United States Supreme Court cases by volume
 List of United States Supreme Court cases by the Rehnquist Court
United States v. Felix (1993)

References

Further reading

External links
 

United States Double Jeopardy Clause case law
United States Supreme Court cases
United States Supreme Court cases of the Rehnquist Court
Overruled United States Supreme Court decisions
1990 in United States case law